Beverly Hills Brats is a 1989 American comedy film. Directed by Jim Sotos, the film starred Peter Billingsley, Martin Sheen, Burt Young, Terry Moore, George Kirby, Ruby Keeler (in her final film) and Whoopi Goldberg in a cameo role.

Plot
Scooter (Billingsley) is a teen from a wealthy Beverly Hills family. After his plastic surgeon father (Sheen) remarries, Scooter is virtually ignored by his father and stepmother (Moore), and treated badly by his two other spoiled siblings, Sterling (Ramon Estevez) and Tiffany (Cathy Podewell). Scooter devises a plan to fake his own kidnapping to get his parents' attention and enlists the help of two bumbling crooks, Clive (Young) and Elmo (Kirby). After Scooter is "kidnapped" and a ransom is demanded, he quickly realizes that his plan failed to work and his parents don't miss him.

Cast
 Peter Billingsley as Scooter
 Martin Sheen as Dr. Jeffery Miller
 Terry Moore as Veronica
 Burt Young as Clive
 George Kirby as Elmo
 Cathy Podewell as Tiffany
 Ramon Estevez as Sterling
 Natalie Schafer as Lillian
 Fernando Allende as Roberto
 Joe Santos as Spyder
 Robert Tessier as Slick
 Ruby Keeler as Goldie
 Vito Scotti as Jerry
 Pat Renella as Lt. Gofield
 Whoopi Goldberg as herself
 Cort McCown as Bart
 Tonya Townsend as Tulip
 Duncan Bravo as Manny
 Jimmy Justice as Deacon
 Aron Eisenberg as Simon
 Michael J Aronin as the Cop

External links
 
 
 

1989 comedy films
1989 films
1980s teen comedy films
1980s English-language films
American comedy films
Films set in Beverly Hills, California
Films scored by Barry Goldberg
Films about kidnapping in the United States
Films directed by Jim Sotos
1980s American films